Andys Creek is a stream in eastern Wayne County, Missouri. It is a tributary of Bear Creek.

Andys Creek, historically called "Andy's Branch", has the name of a pioneer citizen.

See also
List of rivers of Missouri

References

Rivers of Wayne County, Missouri
Rivers of Missouri